A list of Cuban writers, including novelists, poets, and critics:
Cuban authors and writers have influenced and shaped the history of the world. Throughout the years many of their contributions have caused radical shifts: from social movements to global perspectives in the Americas and beyond.

A 

 Brígida Agüero (1837–1866), poet
 Mirta Aguirre (1912–1980), poet, novelist, and journalist
 Magaly Alabau (born 1945), poet
 Dora Alonso (1910–2001), author and journalist
 Reinaldo Arenas (1943–1990), openly gay poet, novelist, and playwright, author of Before Night Falls

B 

 Joaquín Badajoz (born 1972), poet and writer
 Gastón Baquero (1916–1997), poet and writer
 Miguel Barnet, anthropologist and testimonialist
 Antonio Benítez-Rojo (1931–2005), author and critic
 Pedro Luis Boitel (1931–1972), poet and dissident
 Mariano Brull (1891–1956), postmodern poet

C 

 Lydia Cabrera (1899–1991), anthropologist and poet
 Guillermo Cabrera Infante (1929–2005), novelist, author of Tres tristes tigres, Cervantes Prize winner
 Onelio Jorge Cardoso (1914–1986), screenwriter and short fiction writer
 Alejo Carpentier (1904–1980), novelist, author of El reino de este mundo, Cervantes Prize winner
 Julián del Casal, 19th-century poet
 Fidel Castro (1926–2016), former President of Cuba
 Daniel Chavarria, Uruguyan-born author
 Daína Chaviano, novelist and short-story writer
 Enrique Cirules (1938–2016), novelist and essayist
 Domitila García de Coronado (1847–1938), writer, journalist, editor, professor

D 

 Edmundo Desnoes, novelist, author of Memorias del Subdesarrollo
 Jesús Díaz (1941–2002), novelist, filmmaker, and intellectual, founder of the influential cultural magazine Encuentro

E 

 Darío Espina Pérez (October 25, 1920–September 6, 1996), writer, founder and president of La Academia Poética de Miami

F 

 Samuel Feijóo (1914–1992), author
 Roberto Fernández Retamar (1930–2019), poet, essayist, and literary critic
 Norberto Fuentes (born 1943), author and journalist

G 

 Michael John Garcés (born 1967), playwright and director.
 Gertrudis Gómez de Avellaneda (1814–1873), novelist, playwright, and poet, author of Sab (1842) and Baltasar (1858)
 Justo González (born 1937), author and historian
Jorge Enrique González Pacheco (born 1969), poet and cultural entrepreneur 
 Nicolás Guillén (1902–1989), Afro-Cuban poet
 Pedro Juan Gutiérrez (born 1950) "dirty realist" novelist, poet, and painter

H 

 José María Heredia y Heredia (1803–1839), poet
 Georgina Herrera (1936–2021), poet

L 

 Carilda Oliver Labra (1922–2018), poet
 José Lezama Lima (1910–1976), novelist and poet, author of Paradiso
 Eduardo del Llano (born 1962)

M 

 Jorge Mañach (1898–1961), writer
 Juan Francisco Manzano (1797–1854), author and poet
 Dulce María Loynaz (1902–1997), poet, Cervantes Prize winner
 José Martí (1853–1895), poet, journalist, critic, translator, and patriot
 Calixto Martínez, journalist and political prisoner
 Rubén Martínez Villena, writer 
 Domingo del Monte (1804–1853), author and literary critic
 Nancy Morejón (born 1944), Afro-Cuban poet
 Dolan Mor (born 1968)
 Manuel Maria Mustelier (1878–1941), writer and teacher

O 

 Fernando Ortiz (1881–1969), author and essayist
 Lisandro Otero (1932–2008), novelist and journalist

P 
 Heberto Padilla (1932–2000), poet
 Leonardo Padura Fuentes (born 1955), novelist and journalist
 Ricardo Pau-Llosa (born 1954), poet
 Regino Pedroso (1896–1983), poet
 Gustavo Pérez Firmat (born 1949), poet, memoirist, literary critic
 Virgilio Piñera (1912–1979), author, playwright, poet, short-story writer and essayist
 Carlos Pintado (born 1974), poet

R 
 Félix Ramos y Duarte (1848–1924), educator, textbook writer and lexicographer
 José Ignacio Rivero (1920–2011), exile journalist
 Raúl Rivero (1945–2021), dissident poet and journalist
 Antonio Rodríguez Salvador (born 1960), poet, fiction writer, dramatist and essayist
   Isel Rivero (born in 1941 in Havana, Cuba.) poet in exile 1963,

S 

 Pedro Pérez Sarduy (born 1943), poet, novelist and journalist
 Severo Sarduy (1937–1993), neobaroque poet
 Ana María Simo, playwright, essayist and lesbian activist

U 

 Úrsula Céspedes (1832–1874), poet

V 

 Zoé Valdés (born 1959), novelist
 Enrique José Varona (1848–1933), author and journalist
 Cirilo Villaverde, novelist, author of Cecilia Valdés (1882)
 Cintio Vitier (1921–2009), poet, essayist and novelist

Z 

 Juan Clemente Zenea (1832–1871), author and poet
 Héctor Zumbado, writer, journalist, humorist, and critic

See also 
 List of Cuban women writers
 Cuban literature
 List of Cuban American writers
 List of Latin American writers

References 

Writers
Cuban